The Suman gol is a river in Arkhangai. It springs from the Terkhiin Tsagaan Nuur and is a tributary of the Chuluut River. The length is about 50 km.

References 

Rivers of Mongolia